The China National Light Industry Council is a China-wide comprehensive industry intermediary organization with service and management functions.

Its goal is to act as a bridge between government and enterprise by representing a wide range of service and production enterprises. The organization also promotes the development of light industry in China and strengthens international exchange and cooperation.

External links
 Official Website

Foreign trade of China